M. Kampanath (born 1 May 1957) is a Laotian boxer. He competed in the men's light welterweight event at the 1980 Summer Olympics.

References

External links
 

1957 births
Living people
Laotian male boxers
Olympic boxers of Laos
Boxers at the 1980 Summer Olympics
Place of birth missing (living people)
Light-welterweight boxers